Xylocopa amethystina, or Xylocopa (Nodula) amethystina, is a species of carpenter bee. It is distributed in South Asian countries such as, India, Pakistan and Sri Lanka.

Subspecies
 Xylocopa amethystina amethystina (Fabricius, 1793)
 Xylocopa amethystina phanerocephala Cockerell, 1920

References

Further reading
Ruggiero M. (project leader), Ascher J. et al. (2013). ITIS Bees: World Bee Checklist (version Sep 2009). In: Species 2000 & ITIS Catalogue of Life, 11 March 2013 (Roskov Y., Kunze T., Paglinawan L., Orrell T., Nicolson D., Culham A., Bailly N., Kirk P., Bourgoin T., Baillargeon G., Hernandez F., De Wever A., eds). Digital resource at www.catalogueoflife.org/col/. Species 2000: Reading, UK.
Hurd, P.D. and J.S. Moure. 1963. A Classification of the Large Carpenter Bees (Xylocopine) (Hymenoptera: Apoidea). University of California Publications in Entomology (Vol. 29). Berkeley and Los Angeles: University of California Press, 365 pp.

External links
 Species-id.net
 Animaldiversity.org

amethystina
Hymenoptera of Asia
Fauna of Southeast Asia
Insects described in 1793